Susan Graham (born July 23, 1960) is an American mezzo-soprano.

Life and career
Susan Graham was born in Roswell, New Mexico on July 23, 1960. Raised in Midland, Texas, Graham is a graduate of Texas Tech University and the Manhattan School of Music. Her teachers have included Cynthia Hoffmann and Marlena Malas. She studied the piano for 13 years.  She was a winner in the Metropolitan Opera's National Council Auditions, and also a recipient of the Schwabacher Award from the Merola Program of San Francisco Opera.

Graham made her international début at Covent Garden in 1994, playing Massenet's Chérubin.  She has also premièred several roles in contemporary operas, including John Harbison's The Great Gatsby (Jordan Baker), Jake Heggie's Dead Man Walking (Sister Helen Prejean), and Tobias Picker's An American Tragedy (Sondra Finchley).

Graham is a noted champion of the French song repertoire and of songs by contemporary American composers, including Ned Rorem and Lowell Liebermann.  Graham made her Carnegie Hall recital debut in April 2003, and a recording of this recital was later released.

Graham sang "Bless This House" at George W. Bush's second inauguration on January 20, 2005, and Schubert's "Ave Maria" at the nationally televised funeral mass for Senator Edward M. Kennedy of Massachusetts on August 29, 2009.  She is a US delegate for UNESCO.

Opera roles 

Her operatic roles include:
 Dominick Argento
 The Aspern Papers (Sonia) 1990; (Tina) 2013
 Samuel Barber
 Vanessa (Erika)
 Alban Berg
 Lulu (Countess Geschwitz) Metropolitan Opera 2015
 Hector Berlioz
 Béatrice et Bénédict (Béatrice) 1997
 La damnation de Faust (Marguerite) La Scala, Metropolitan Opera November 2008
 Les Troyens (Didon) Théâtre du Châtelet, (Paris); Metropolitan Opera; San Francisco Opera
Marc Blitzstein
Regina (Regina Giddens) 2018
 Christoph Willibald Gluck
 Iphigénie en Tauride (Iphigénie)
 Alexander Goehr
 Arianna (Arianna)
 Charles Gounod
 Roméo et Juliette (Stephano) Seattle Opera
 George Frideric Handel
 Alcina (Ruggerio)
 Xerxes (Serse – Title Role), San Francisco Opera
 Ariodante Houston Grand Opera, San Francisco Opera
 John Harbison
 The Great Gatsby (Jordan Baker) 1999
 Jake Heggie
 Dead Man Walking (Sister Helen Prejean)
Three Decembers (Madeline Mitchell), Opera San Jose
 Franz Lehár
 The Merry Widow Hanna Glawari (the title character)
 Jules Massenet
 Werther (Charlotte)
 Chérubin Royal Opera House
 Claudio Monteverdi
 L'incoronazione di Poppea (Poppea)
 Il ritorno d'Ulisse in patria (Minerva)
 Wolfgang Amadeus Mozart
 Così fan tutte (Dorabella)
 Don Giovanni (Donna Elvira) Lyric Opera of Chicago
 Idomeneo (Idamante) Houston Grand Opera, Palais Garnier, Paris
 La clemenza di Tito (Sesto) Opéra National de Paris and concert performances
 Le nozze di Figaro (Cherubino) Metropolitan Opera
 Lucio Silla (Cecilio), Santa Fe Opera
 Tobias Picker
 An American Tragedy (Sondra Finchley) Metropolitan Opera world première
 Henry Purcell
 Dido and Aeneas (Sorceress, Dido)
 Gioachino Rossini
 Il barbiere di Siviglia (Rosina)
 Richard Strauss
 Ariadne auf Naxos (Composer) Metropolitan Opera, Royal Opera House, and Glyndebourne
 Der Rosenkavalier (Octavian)
 Giuseppe Verdi
 Falstaff (Meg Page)

Awards 
 2001 Chevalier of the Order of Arts and Letters (Chevalier dans l'Ordre des Arts et des Lettres)
 June 2005 Commander of the Order of Arts and Letters
 Musical America 2004 Vocalist of the Year
 2004 Grammy Award for Best Classical Vocal Performance, for her album Ives: Songs (The Things Our Fathers Loved; The Housatonic At Stockbridge, Etc.)
 2005 Opera News Award
 September 5, 2006 Midland, Texas first annual "Susan Graham Day"
 May 2008, Honorary Doctorate, Manhattan School of Music

Some of the recordings have also received awards. See below.

Recordings

1992
 Pulcinella (Stravinsky) Seattle Symphony Orchestra, Gerard Schwarz (conductor) Delos Records 3100
1995
 Scenes from Goethe's Faust (Schumann) Bryn Terfel, Karita Mattila, Jan-Hendrik Rootering, Barbara Bonney, Endrik Wottrich, Iris Vermillion, Brigitte Poschner-Klebel, Susan Graham, Hans Peter Blochwitz, Harry Peeters, Berliner Philharmoniker, Claudio Abbado (conductor).  Sony Classical 66308
1996
 Roméo et Juliette (Charles Gounod) Plácido Domingo, Ruth Ann Swenson, Miles, Kurt Ollmann, Susan Graham, Alain Vernhes, Paul Charles Clarke; Bayerischen Rundfunkorchester und chor, Münchner Rundfunkorchester, Leonard Slatkin (conductor). RCA 68440
1997
 Béatrice et Bénédict (Berlioz). Catherine Robbin (Ursule), Gabriel Bacquier (Somarone), Gilles Cachemaille (Claudio), Jean-Luc Viala (Bénédict), Philippe Magnant (Léonato), Susan Graham (Béatrice), Sylvia McNair (Héro), Vincent le Texier (Don Pedro), Lyon Opera Orchestra and Chorus, John Nelson (conductor). MusiFrance 2292
 The Gold & Silver Gala Graham duets with Plácido Domingo in "Là ci darem la mano". EMI Classics 56337
 Les nuits d'été and Opera Arias (Berlioz)  Les nuits d'été Op. 7 and songs from La Damnation De Faust Op. 24, Benvenuto Cellini, Les Troyens, Béatrice et Bénédict. Orchestra of the Royal Opera House, John Nelson (conductor) Sony 62730
1998
 La Belle Époque – The Songs of Reynaldo Hahn (Hahn) Roger Vignoles (piano) Sony. Awards: Winner of Performance Today "Critic's Choice" Award; the 1999 Caecilia Prize; Preis der Deutschen Schallplattenkritik critic's award; Choc du Monde de la Musique; Opera International's Timbre de Platine. Sony 60168
 Debussy La Damoiselle élue. Sylvia McNair, Susan Graham, Boston Symphony Orchestra Seiji Ozawa. Philips 446682 (with Ravel: Shéhérazade and Britten Les illuminations).
2000
 Strauss: Der Rosenkavalier Act 1 – closing scene; Act 3 – Trio and finale; Arabella Act 1 duet; Capriccio – closing scene. Renée Fleming (Marschallin), Barbara Bonney, Susan Graham (Octavian), Vienna PO, Christoph Eschenbach (conductor) Decca 466 314-2
 Songs of Ned Rorem (Rorem) Malcolm Martineau (piano) Rorem's settings of poems by Paul Goodman, Theodore Roethke, Witter Bynner, Tennyson, Walt Whitman and others. Erato 80222
 Alcina (Handel) Renée Fleming, Susan Graham, Natalie Dessay, Kathleen Kuhlmann, Timothy Robinson, Laurent Naouri, Juanita Lascarro, Michael Loughlin-Smith, Maurizio Rossano, Laurent Collobert, Eric Demarteau, Les Arts Florissants, William Christie (conductor). Erato 80233
 Berlioz: L'enfance du Christ; Three Irlande songs; Sara la baigneuse Susan Graham, François Le Roux, John Mark Ainsley, Montreal SO and Chorus, Dutoit. Decca
2001
 Il tenero momento (Mozart and Gluck).  Orchestra of the Age of Enlightenment, Harry Bicket (conductor) Erato Best Recital Disc in 2001 (The Gramophone), German Echo Klassik award, Prix Gabriel Fauré and the Grand Prix (Académie du disque)
2002
 Dead Man Walking (Heggie) Susan Graham, Catherine Cook, Robert Orth, Frederica von Stade, Nicolle Foland, David Harper, San Francisco Opera Orchestra, Patrick Summers (conductor). Erato 86238-2
 C'est ça la vie, c'est ça l'amour (Songs by Moïse Simons, Messager, Maurice Yvain, Honegger, Hahn, and Mahler) City of Birmingham Symphony Orchestra, Yves Abel (conductor). Erato 42106

2003
 At Carnegie Hall (Songs by Brahms, Debussy, Berg, Poulenc, Messager, Moïse Simons, Hahn, Mahler, and Ben Moore.) Malcolm Martineau (piano) Erato 2564 60295-2
2004
 Songs (Ives) 2005 Grammy Award for Best Classical Vocal Performance. Pierre-Laurent Aimard (piano), Emmanuel Pahud (flute), Tabea Zimmermann (viola).  Warner Classics 2564 60297-2 (with Concord Sonata)
 Vanessa (Barber). Susan Graham (Erika), Christine Brewer (Vanessa), William Burden (Anatol), Michael Davis, Neal Davies (The Old Doctor), Catherine Wyn-Rogers (Old Baroness), Simon Birchall (Nicholas), Stephen Charlesworth (Footman), BBC Singers (Servants, Guests, Peasants), Anthony Legge (conductor), BBC Symphony Orchestra, Leonard Slatkin (conductor). Chandos CHSA 5032
 Les Troyens (Berlioz) – DVD. Susan Graham (Didon), Gregory Kunde (Énée), Laurent Naouri (Narbal), Lydia Korniordou (Andromaque), Mark Padmore (Iopas), Topi Lehtipuu (Hylas/Hélénus), Fernand Bernardi (Ghost of Hector), Danielle Bouthillon (Hécube), Nicolas Courjal (Trojan Guard), Benjamin Davies (Trojan soldier), Frances Jellard (Polyxène), Anna Caterina Antonacci (Cassandre), Ludovic Tézier (Chorèbe), Renata Pokupić (Anna), Quentin Gac (Astyanax), Stéphanie d'Oustrac (Ascagne), Nicolas Testé (Panthée), René Schirrer (Priam), Laurent Alvaro (Trojan Guard), Robert Davies (Greek Captain), Simon Davies (Priest of Pluto), Monteverdi Choir, Chœur du Théâtre du Châtelet, Orchestre Révolutionnaire et Romantique, John Eliot Gardiner (conductor). Opus Arte OA 0900 D
 Dido and Aeneas (Purcell) Susan Graham (Dido), Ian Bostridge (Aeneas), Camilla Tilling (Belinda), Felicity Palmer (Sorceress), David Daniels (Spirit), Cécile de Boever (Second Woman), Paul Agnew (A Sailor), Emmanuelle Haïm (conductor), European Voices, Le Concert d'Astrée. Virgin Veritas 45605. Grammy Award nomination. Maria Callas award from the Académie du Disque Lyrique

2005
 Poèmes de l'amour – Chausson Poème de l'amour et de la mer; Ravel Shéhérazade; Debussy orch. Adams Songs from Le Livre De Baudelaire  BBC Symphony Orchestra, Yan Pascal Tortelier Warner Classics 2564 619382 (CD) 
 Sacred Songs Renée Fleming (soprano), London Voices, RPO/Delfs. Decca 475 6925. Graham sings a duet with Fleming in "Abends will ich schlafen gehn" from Engelbert Humperdinck's Hänsel und Gretel.
2006
 La clemenza di Tito (Mozart). Christoph Prégardien (Tito), Susan Graham (Sesto), Catherine Naglestad (Vitellia), Ekaterina Siurina (Servillia), Hannah Esther Minutillo (Annio), Roland Bracht (Publio). Opus Arte OA 0942 DVD
 Werther (Massenet) – DVD Thomas Hampson (Werther), Susan Graham (Charlotte), Sandrine Piau, Stéphane Degout (Albert), Michel Plasson (conductor), Châtelet Opera, Orchestre National du Capitole de Toulouse. Virgin Classics

2008
 Berlioz La mort de Cléopâtre Berliner Philharmoniker, Sir Simon Rattle EMI 2162240
 Un Frisson Français: A Century of French Song Songs by Georges Bizet, César Franck, Édouard Lalo, Charles Gounod, Camille Saint-Saëns, Emmanuel Chabrier, Émile Paladilhe, Ernest Chausson, Alfred Bachelet, Henri Duparc, Maurice Ravel, André Caplet, Albert Roussel, Olivier Messiaen, Claude Debussy, Gabriel Fauré, Reynaldo Hahn, Erik Satie, Arthur Honegger, Joseph Canteloube, Manuel Rosenthal, and Francis Poulenc.  Malcolm Martineau (piano) Onyx Classics ONYX4030

2010
 Susan Graham – French Songs Ideale Audience International: 3079128 (DVD)
 Mahler: Songs with Orchestra, Susan Graham, Thomas Hampson, San Francisco Symphony, Michael Tilson Thomas Avie: 82193600362
 Passing By - Songs by Jake Heggie Avie: AV2198 (singing "A lucky child" from At the Statue of Venus, and "Motherwit" and "Mother in the mirror" from Facing Forward/Looking Back)

References

External links 

 
 Susan Graham Operabase
 The New York Times Susan Graham news

1960 births
Living people
American women pianists
Manhattan School of Music faculty
Operatic mezzo-sopranos
People from Roswell, New Mexico
People from Midland, Texas
Grammy Award winners
Texas Tech University alumni
Commandeurs of the Ordre des Arts et des Lettres
Singers from Texas
Singers from New Mexico
20th-century American women  opera singers
20th-century American pianists
21st-century American women  opera singers
Classical musicians from Texas
21st-century American pianists
Women music educators
Erato Records artists
American women academics